The 2018 Dynamic Billiard Treviso Open, was the first Euro Tour 9-Ball pool event in 2018. The event was won by Albania's Eklent Kaçi who defeated Austria's Albin Ouschan 9–5 in the final. This was Kaci's first Euro Tour victory.

2017's Treviso Open champion Wiktor Zieliński lost in the last 32 of the event against Sergei Luzker. Top Euro Tour players, such as 2017 Overall winner Ralf Souquet did not compete at the event, as the event was held at the same time as the 2018 World Pool Masters. The event is not to be confused with the 2018 Treviso Open; another event held in the Euro Tour in November.

Tournament format
The event saw a total of 153 players compete, in a double-elimination knockout tournament, until the last 32 stage; where the tournament was contested as single elimination.

Prize fund

Tournament results

References

External links

Euro Tour
2018 Euro Tour events
March 2018 sports events in Italy